Clarence Chester Childs (July 24, 1883 – September 16, 1960) was an American athlete who competed mainly in the hammer throw.  He served as the head football coach at Indiana University from 1914 to 1915, compiling a record of 6–7–1.

Biography
He was born on July 24, 1883, in Wooster, Ohio. He lived in Fremont, Ohio, for much of his youth where he played football for the Fremont Football Club. He became Captain of the Yale track team before he competed for the United States in the 1912 Summer Olympics held in Stockholm, Sweden in the hammer throw where he won the bronze medal. Childs was the football coach at Indiana University and served in France during World War I. Childs was appointed by President Warren Harding to a position within the U.S. Treasury Department, but was fired when he attacked a United States Secret Service agent, who was following him on suspicion that Childs had illegally removed sensitive documents. He died in Washington, D.C., on September 16, 1960.

Head coaching record

Football

References

External links

 

1883 births
1960 deaths
American football guards
American male hammer throwers
American military personnel of World War I
Athletes (track and field) at the 1912 Summer Olympics
Indiana Hoosiers athletic directors
Indiana Hoosiers football coaches
Medalists at the 1912 Summer Olympics
Olympic bronze medalists for the United States in track and field
Wooster Fighting Scots football coaches
Yale Bulldogs football players
Yale Bulldogs men's track and field athletes
People from Fremont, Ohio
People from Wooster, Ohio
Coaches of American football from Ohio
Players of American football from Ohio
Track and field athletes from Ohio